The Pelican History of England is a book series on English history published under the mass-market Pelican Books imprint of Penguin Books between 1950 and 1965. It was subsequently revised and reprinted in numerous editions and the series is said to have "shaped the historical thinking of generations". The series editor was G. M. Trevelyan and the contributors to the series were strongly influenced by the "Whig" view of history which Trevelyan shared. 

The series comprised:
Roman Britain (1955), by Ian Richmond
The Beginnings of English Society (1952), by Dorothy Whitelock
English Society in the Early Middle Ages (1951), by Doris Mary Stenton
England in the Late Middle Ages (1952), by A.R. Myers
Tudor England (1950), by Stanley Bindoff
England in the Seventeenth Century (1952), by Maurice Ashley. Ashley's book was superseded by J.P. Kenyon's Stuart England (1978)
England in the Eighteenth Century (1950), by J.H. Plumb
England in the Nineteenth Century (1950), by David Thomson
England in the Twentieth Century (1965), by David Thomson

In many of the studies, England was often substituted for Britain or the United Kingdom to produce a cohesive view of the past. The Penguin History of Britain, published in nine volumes over 1996–2018, is intended to supersede the "now dated" series.

See also
Oxford History of England (1936–1965)

References

1950s books
1960s books
Historiography of England
Series of history books
Penguin Books book series